Airglow (also called nightglow) is a faint emission of light by a planetary atmosphere. In the case of Earth's atmosphere, this optical phenomenon causes the night sky never to be completely dark, even after the effects of starlight and diffused sunlight from the far side are removed. This phenomenon originates with self-illuminated gases and has no relationship with Earth's magnetism or sunspot activity.

History

The airglow phenomenon was first identified in 1868 by Swedish physicist Anders Ångström. Since then, it has been studied in the laboratory, and various chemical reactions have been observed to emit electromagnetic energy as part of the process. Scientists have identified some of those processes that would be present in Earth's atmosphere, and astronomers have verified that such emissions are present. Simon Newcomb was the first person to scientifically study and describe airglow, in 1901 

Airglow existed in pre-industrial society and was known to the ancient Greeks. "Aristotle and Pliny described the phenomena of Chasmata, which can be identified in part as auroras, and in part as bright airglow nights."

Description

Airglow is caused by various processes in the upper atmosphere of Earth, such as the recombination of atoms which were photoionized by the Sun during the day, luminescence caused by cosmic rays striking the upper atmosphere, and chemiluminescence caused mainly by oxygen and nitrogen reacting with hydroxyl free radicals at heights of a few hundred kilometres. It is not noticeable during the daytime due to the glare and scattering of sunlight.

Even at the best ground-based observatories, airglow limits the photosensitivity of optical telescopes. Partly for this reason, space telescopes like Hubble can observe much fainter objects than current ground-based telescopes at visible wavelengths.

Airglow at night may be bright enough for a ground observer to notice and appears generally bluish. Although airglow emission is fairly uniform across the atmosphere, it appears brightest at about 10° above the observer's horizon, since the lower one looks, the greater the mass of atmosphere one is looking through. Very low down, however, atmospheric extinction reduces the apparent brightness of the airglow.

One airglow mechanism is when an atom of nitrogen combines with an atom of oxygen to form a molecule of nitric oxide (NO). In the process, a photon is emitted. This photon may have any of several different wavelengths characteristic of nitric oxide molecules. The free atoms are available for this process, because molecules of nitrogen (N2) and oxygen (O2) are dissociated by solar energy in the upper reaches of the atmosphere and may encounter each other to form NO. Other chemicals that can create air glow in the atmosphere are hydroxyl (OH), atomic oxygen (O), sodium (Na), and lithium (Li).

The sky brightness is typically measured in units of apparent magnitude per square arcsecond of sky.

Calculation

In order to calculate the relative intensity of airglow, we need to convert apparent magnitudes into fluxes of photons; this clearly depends on the spectrum of the source, but we will ignore that initially. At visible wavelengths, we need the parameter S0(V), the power per square centimetre of aperture and per micrometre of wavelength produced by a zeroth-magnitude star, to convert apparent magnitudes into fluxes – . If we take the example of a V=28 star observed through a normal V band filter ( bandpass, frequency ), the number of photons we receive per square centimeter of telescope aperture per second from the source is Ns:

(where h is Planck's constant; hν is the energy of a single photon of frequency ν).

This gives the number of photons from airglow, Na:

The signal-to-noise for an ideal ground-based observation with a telescope of area A (ignoring losses and detector noise), arising from Poisson statistics, is only:

If we assume a 10 m diameter ideal ground-based telescope and an unresolved star: every second, over a patch the size of the seeing-enlarged image of the star, 35 photons arrive from the star and 3500 from air-glow. So, over an hour, roughly  arrive from the air-glow, and approximately  arrive from the source; so the S/N ratio is about:

We can compare this with "real" answers from exposure time calculators. For an 8 m unit Very Large Telescope telescope, according to the FORS exposure time calculator, 40 hours of observing time are needed to reach V = 28, while the 2.4 m Hubble only takes 4 hours according to the ACS exposure time calculator. A hypothetical 8 m Hubble telescope would take about 30 minutes.

It should be clear from this calculation that reducing the view field size can make fainter objects more detectable against the airglow; unfortunately, adaptive optics techniques that reduce the diameter of the view field of an Earth-based telescope by an order of magnitude only as yet work in the infrared, where the sky is much brighter. A space telescope isn't restricted by the view field, since it is not affected by airglow.

Induced airglow

Scientific experiments have been conducted to induce airglow by directing high-power radio emissions at the Earth's ionosphere. These radiowaves interact with the ionosphere to induce faint but visible optical light at specific wavelengths under certain conditions.
The effect is also observable in the radio frequency band, using ionosondes.

Experimental observation

SwissCube-1 is a Swiss satellite operated by Ecole Polytechnique Fédérale de Lausanne. The spacecraft is a single unit CubeSat, which was designed to conduct research into airglow within the Earth's atmosphere and to develop technology for future spacecraft. Though SwissCube-1 is rather small (10 x 10 x 10 cm) and weighs less than 1 kg, it carries a small telescope for obtaining images of the airglow. The first SwissCube-1 image came down on 18 February 2011 and was quite black with some thermal noise on it. The first airglow image came down on 3 March 2011. This image has been converted to the human optical range (green) from its near-infrared measurement. This image provides a measurement of the intensity of the airglow phenomenon in the near-infrared. The range measured is from 500 to 61400 photons, with a resolution of 500 photons.

Observation of airglow on other planets
The Venus Express spacecraft contains an infrared sensor which has detected near-IR emissions from the upper atmosphere of Venus. The emissions come from nitric oxide (NO) and from molecular oxygen.
Scientists had previously determined in laboratory testing that during NO production, ultraviolet emissions and near-IR emissions were produced. The UV radiation had been detected in the atmosphere, but until this mission, the atmosphere-produced near-IR emissions were only theoretical.

Gallery

See also
Earthlight
Ionized air glow
Optical phenomena
Polar aurora
Zodiacal light

References

External links

Description and Images
Sky Brightness Information for Roque de los Muchachos Observatory
Night-side Glow Detected at Mars Space.com interview
Stereoscopic Observations of HAARP Glows from HIPAS, Poker Flat, and Nenana, Alaska by R.F. Wuerker et al.
An improved signal-to-noise ratio of a cool imaging photon detector for Fabry - Perot interferometer measurements of low-intensity air glow by T P Davies and P L Dyson
Space Telescope Imaging Spectrograph Instrument Handbook for Cycle 13
SwissCube| The first Swiss Satellite

Articles containing video clips
Atmospheric optical phenomena
Light sources
Observational astronomy
Plasma physics